Kawamata (written: 川又 or 川俣) is a Japanese surname. Notable people with the surname include:

, Japanese writer
, Japanese footballer
, Japanese rugby union player
, Japanese artist
, Japanese mathematician

See also
, town in Date District, Fukushima Prefecture, Japan
, train station in Meiwa, Gunma Prefecture, Japan

Japanese-language surnames